Barbara J. Ford is an American librarian who served as president of the American Library Association from 1997 to 1998. She earned a bachelor's degree from Illinois Wesleyan University, a master's degree in International Relations from Tufts University and a master's degree in library science from the University of Illinois at Urbana-Champaign.

She served in the Peace Corps volunteer in Panama and Nicaragua.

Her professional positions include assistant commissioner for central library services at the Chicago Public Library; executive director of the Virginia Commonwealth University libraries; and associate library director at Trinity University in San Antonio, Texas. She has also served in several positions at the University of Illinois at Chicago.

Ford was Director of Mortenson Center for International Library Programs at the University of Illinois at Urbana-Champaign Libraries from 2003 to 2014.

Ford's ALA Presidential theme was “Libraries: Global Reach – Local Touch” during. Earlier in her career she was president of the Association of College and Research Libraries from 1990- 1991.
She served as an elected member of the Governing Board of the International Federation of Library Associations and Institutions from 2005 to 2009 and as a member of the U.S. National Commission for UNESCO from 2011 to 2013.

Honors
The American Librarian Association recognized Barbara Ford's many contributions to the library community by including her in its ALA Legacy Society Honor Roll. She was the inaugural speaker for the Jean E. Coleman Library Outreach Lecture. On 22 April 2016 the Illinois Library Association awarded her as an Illinois Library Luminary for her dedication to the field.

Select publications
 "Global Perspectives on Public Libraries." Introduction to Public Librarianship. . New York: Neal-Schuman, 2011.
Ford, Barbara J. "LIS Professionals in a Global Society." The Portable MLIS: Insights from the Experts. . Westport, Ct.: Libraries Unlimited, 2008. 195–203.
Ford, Barbara J. "A Global Leadership Context for Librarians." Thinking Outside the Borders: Library Leadership in a World Community. . Urbana: Mortenson Center, 2008. 8-16.
"Developing an International Library Leadership Institute: Thinking Outside the Borders." Continuing Professional Development: Pathways to Leadership in the Library and Information World. . Munchen: K.G. Saur, 2007. 40–56.
Ford, Barbara J. "Librarians: Our Reach Is Global and Our touch Is Local." Perspectives, Insights & Priorities: 17 Leaders Speak Freely of Librarianship. . Lanham: Scarecrow Press, 2005. 49–54.
"Global Perspectives on Public Libraries." Introduction to Public Librarianship. . New York: Neal-Schuman, 2004. 265–291.

References

 

Living people
American women librarians
American librarians
Presidents of the American Library Association
Illinois Wesleyan University alumni
Tufts University alumni
University of Illinois School of Information Sciences alumni
University of Illinois Urbana-Champaign faculty
Year of birth missing (living people)
Place of birth missing (living people)
UNESCO
21st-century American women